Spafford is an unincorporated community in Ewington Township, Jackson County, Minnesota, United States.

References

Unincorporated communities in Jackson County, Minnesota
Unincorporated communities in Minnesota